Andreu Nin Pérez (4 February 1892 – 20 June 1937) was a Spanish communist politician, translator and publicist. In 1937, Nin and the rest of the POUM leadership were arrested by the Moscow-oriented government of the Second Spanish Republic on trumped up charges of collaborating with Francisco Franco's Nationalists and were tortured to death by Soviet NKVD agents. On 17 June 2013, 76 years after his death, the Parliament of Catalonia officially paid homage to him and his work on politics with special emphasis on his work as Justice Minister of Catalonia.

Early life 
Born in El Vendrell, Tarragona, to a poor family (his father was a shoemaker and his mother was a peasant), Nin moved to Barcelona shortly before World War I; he taught briefly in a secular anarchist school but soon became a journalist and activist. In 1917, he joined the Spanish Socialist Workers' Party (PSOE).

Nin became a leader of the Spanish workers' movement, and was among the founders of the Communist Party of Spain (PCE). He consequently worked for the Comintern and Red International of Labour Unions (RILU or Profintern) in the Soviet Union. While in Russia, he was won over to the Left Opposition which confronted Joseph Stalin's ascending faction within the Communist Party of the Soviet Union. He briefly worked as secretary to Leon Trotsky while in Russia. It was during this time he also began translating several of Trotsky's works into Spanish and Catalan.

Returning to Spain, Nin was instrumental in forming the Communist Left of Spain (ICE), the self-designated Trotskyist group affiliated to the International Left Opposition (ILO). However, the ICE was a small group and largely isolated. Nin had a number of disagreements with Trotsky in this period, specifically when Trotsky advised the ICE leader that entry into the Socialist Youth of Spain would augment the forces at their disposal, while Nin advocated forming a united party with the Workers and Peasants Bloc (BOC), a group coming out of the communist movement but seen as being on its right wing.

POUM 
Eventually Nin broke with Trotsky and the ILO on this question, and the merger went ahead. Together with Joaquín Maurín, he formed the Workers' Party of Marxist Unification (POUM) in 1935, as a communist alternative to the Comintern-aligned PCE.

After the region of Catalonia saw its regional government, the Generalitat, reinstated by the Spanish Republic in the opening phase of the Spanish Civil War, Nin joined the devolved government headed by Lluís Companys, as regional minister of Justice. However, as Spain's communists gained sway in the Republican government, they moved to purge ex-communists and those independent of Moscow from the government, which would include POUM. Following a threat from Soviet consul Vladimir Antonov-Ovseenko to withhold Soviet aid, Companys sacked Nin from his cabinet on 16 December 1936, concluding a controversial tenure.

Arrest and disappearance 

Following the violent May Days of Barcelona, on 16 June 1937, the government, under PCE pressure, declared POUM illegal. On the orders of Alexander Orlov, Nin and most of the POUM leadership were arrested and sent to a camp at Alcalá de Henares, near Madrid. Nin was tortured for several days under the supervision of the NKVD. Jesús Hernández Tomás, then a member of the Communist Party, and Minister of Education in the Popular Front government, later wrote: 

He was finally executed on 20 June 1937.

Health minister Federica Montseny was one of the first to raise the issue in public, asking, "Where is Nin?" following a lack of news about his detainment.

References

Sources 
 Andrew Durgan, BOC 1930–1936: El Bloque Obrero y Campesino (BOC 1930–1936: The Workers' and Peasants' Bloc). Barcelona: Laertes S.A. de Ediciones, 1996.
 Andrew Durgan, Dissident Communism in Catalonia, 1930–36. PhD dissertation. University of London, 1989.
 Pelai Pagès, Andreu Nin: Su evolución política (1911–37) (Andreu Nin: His Political Evolution, 1911–37). Bilbao: Editorial Zero, 1975.
 Pelai Pagès, Andreu Nin: Una vida al servicio de la clase obrera (Andreu Nin: A Life in the Service of the Working Class). Barcelona: Laertes S.A. de Ediciones, 2011.
 Alan Sennett, Revolutionary Marxism in Spain, 1930–1937. [2014] Chicago: Haymarket Books, 2015.

External links 
 Fundación Andreu Nin The Spanish-language site containing an extensive collection of documents, biographical notes, and links related to the POUM and to Nin himself.
 Andrés Nin Archive at marxists.org
 Andreu Nin at the Association of Catalan Language Writers, AELC. Webpage in Catalan with English and Spanish translations.
  Andrés Nin: El crimen que remató la República.
 Struggle of the trade unions against fascism 1923 pamphlet
 La huelga general de enero y sus enseñanzas. 1930s pamphlet
 Documents on Nin from "Trabajadores: The Spanish Civil War through the eyes of organised labour", a digitised collection of more than 13,000 pages of documents from the archives of the British Trades Union Congress held in the Modern Records Centre, University of Warwick
 New Perspectives on The Spanish Civil War, archival and related research on the historiography of the Spanish Civil War since the death of Franco by Stephen Schwartz

1892 births
1937 deaths
20th-century translators
Executed writers
People from Baix Penedès
People killed by the Second Spanish Republic
People killed in NKVD operations
Politicians from Catalonia
POUM politicians
Right Opposition
Secretaries General of the Confederación Nacional del Trabajo
Spanish Comintern people
Spanish communists
Spanish murder victims
Spanish people of the Spanish Civil War (Republican faction)
Spanish torturees
Spanish translators
Translators to Catalan
Translators from Russian